Valery Tarakanov (born 9 August 1941 in Yaroslavl) is a Soviet/Russian former cross-country skier who competed in the late 1960s and early 1970s. He won the 4x10 km gold at the 1970 FIS Nordic World Ski Championships in Vysoké Tatry. Tarakanov also finished 6th in the 15 km in the same championships. He was on the 4x10 km team that finished fourth at the 1968 Winter Olympics in Grenoble.

External links

1941 births
Living people
Soviet male cross-country skiers
Cross-country skiers at the 1964 Winter Olympics
Cross-country skiers at the 1968 Winter Olympics
Cross-country skiers at the 1972 Winter Olympics
Olympic cross-country skiers of the Soviet Union
FIS Nordic World Ski Championships medalists in cross-country skiing
Universiade medalists in cross-country skiing
Universiade silver medalists for the Soviet Union
Competitors at the 1964 Winter Universiade
Sportspeople from Yaroslavl